Mariusz Mężyk (born September 2, 1983, in Nowy Sącz) is a Polish striker who plays for Limanovia Limanowa on loan from Kolejarz Stróże.

Career
In the summer 2009, he joined Kolejarz Stróże.

References

External links 
 Profile at 90minut.pl

1983 births
Living people
Polish footballers
Association football forwards
Pogoń Staszów players
KSZO Ostrowiec Świętokrzyski players
Stal Gorzyce players
Sandecja Nowy Sącz players
ŁKS Łódź players
Polonia Bytom players
Kolejarz Stróże players
Limanovia Limanowa players
Sportspeople from Nowy Sącz
Glinik Gorlice players